The 1983 North Indian Ocean cyclone season was part of the annual cycle of tropical cyclone formation. The season has no official bounds but cyclones tend to form between April and December. These dates conventionally delimit the period of each year when most tropical cyclones form in the northern Indian Ocean. There are two main seas in the North Indian Ocean—the Bay of Bengal to the east of the Indian subcontinent and the Arabian Sea to the west of India. The official Regional Specialized Meteorological Centre in this basin is the India Meteorological Department (IMD), while the Joint Typhoon Warning Center (JTWC) releases unofficial advisories. An average of five tropical cyclones form in the North Indian Ocean every season with peaks in May and November. Cyclones occurring between the meridians 45°E and 100°E are included in the season by the IMD.



Systems

Tropical Storm Aurora (1A)

On August 9 a tropical depression developed in the northwest Arabian Sea. It tracked westward, becoming a tropical storm later that day. Aurora reached a peak of 50 mph winds before hitting eastern Oman on the 10th, where it dissipated shortly thereafter. The system was unofficially named as Aurora by the JTWC.

On Masirah Island, the storm dropped  of rainfall.

Tropical Storm Two (2B)

Tropical Storm Two, which began its life on October 1 in the central Bay of Bengal, hit northeastern India on the 3rd as a 60 mph tropical storm, dissipating the next day.

Severe Cyclonic Storm Herbert
The remnants of Tropical Storm Herbert entered the basin on October 12 and redeveloped into a deep depression on October 14. Herbert reintensified into a 65 mph severe cyclonic storm before making landfall in Bangladesh on October 15 and dissipating thereafter.

Tropical Depression Kim (16W)

The remnants of Western Pacific Tropical Storm Kim redeveloped in the northeastern Bay of Bengal near Myanmar. It moved parallel the coastline, hit western Myanmar, and dissipated on the 20th.

Tropical Storm Three (3B)

65 mph Tropical Storm Three, which developed on November 5 in the central Bay of Bengal, hit southeastern Bangladesh on the 9th. The storm quickly dissipated without causing any reported damage.

See also

North Indian Ocean tropical cyclone
1983 Atlantic hurricane season
1983 Pacific hurricane season
1983 Pacific typhoon season
Australian cyclone seasons: 1982–83, 1983–84
South Pacific cyclone seasons: 1982–83, 1983–84
South-West Indian Ocean cyclone seasons: 1982–83, 1983–84

References

External links
India Meteorological Department
Joint Typhoon Warning Center 

 
1983 NIO